Rajya Sabha elections were held in 1998, to elect members of the Rajya Sabha, Indian Parliament's upper chamber. 13 members from 6 states  and 57 members from 14 states were elected.

Elections
Elections were held in 1998 to elect members from various states.
The list is incomplete.

Members elected
The following members are elected in the elections held in 1998. They are members for the term 1998–2004 and retire in year 2004, except in case of the resignation or death before the term.

Bye-elections
The following bye elections were held in the year 1998.

 Bye-elections were held on 27-03-1998 for vacancy from West Bengal due to death of seating member Tridib Chowdhury on 21-12-1997  with term ending on 18-08-1999.  Abani Roy of RSP got elected.
 Bye-elections were held on 27-03-1998 for vacancy from Karnataka and Jammu and Kashmir due to election to Lok Sabha of seating member H D Deve Gowda on 01-03-1998  with term ending on 09.04.2002 and Saifuddin Soz on 01-03-1998  with term ending on 22.11.2002. 
 Bye-elections were held on 27-03-1998 for vacancy from Orissa and Kerala due to election to Lok Sabha of seating member Jayanti Patnaik on 02.04.2002  with term ending on 09.04.2002 and K.Karunakaran on 01-03-1998  with term ending on 21.04.2003. C. O. Poulose of CPM won from Kerala.
 Bye-elections were held on 27-03-1998 for vacancy from Gujarat due to resignation of seating member Anandiben Patel on -- with term ending on 02.04.2000.

References

1998 elections in India
1998